Bring Me The Head of Kyle Bobby Dunn is a full length double compact disc album from Canadian composer Kyle Bobby Dunn. It was recorded at Bunce Cake studios in Brooklyn and remote parts of Canada. The compositions are mostly long, slowly evolving minimal works created from electric guitar processing. The album is his second double album since 2010's Low Point release, A Young Person's Guide to Kyle Bobby Dunn.

The album was remastered in 2021 by Maryam Sirvan and Milad Bagheri who worked on the 2019 album, From Here to Eternity. It was reissued and released in a limited triple vinyl pressing by Paris, France based Diggers Factory and the remastered collection was made available digitally everywhere.

Critical Reaction

Track listing
Disque Un
"Canticle of Votier's Flats" - 1:59	
"La Chanson de Beurrage" – 14:37
"Ending of All Odds" – 4:45
"Douglas Glen Theme" – 12:00
"An Evening with Dusty" - 8:10
"The Hungover" - 12:13
"Diamond Cove (And Its Children Were Watching)" - 3:52

Disque Deux
"The Troubles with Trés Belles" - 5:56
"Innisfal (Rivers of My Fathers) - 7:37
"The Calm Idiots of Yesterday" - 10:48
"Parkland" - 10:39
"Complétia Terrace" - 6:15
"In Search of a Poetic Whole" - 7:41
"Kotylak" - 8:21
"Moitié et Moitié - 7:00

References

External links

 Review; "Anti-Gravity Bunny"
 Review; "The Milk Factory"
 Review; "Fluid Radio"

2012 albums
Kyle Bobby Dunn albums